Naoki Nagasaka (長坂 尚樹、born 24 April 1953) is a Japanese former racing driver. He has competed professionally in several Japan championships from the 1970s to the 1990s. He won the Japanese Touring Car Championship in 1985 and 1987, where he collected 6 wins and 15 podiums. He was also crowned at the 1984 All Japan Sports Prototype Championship.

Racing record

24 Hours of Le Mans results

Complete Japanese Touring Car Championship (-1993) results

Complete Japanese Touring Car Championship (1994-) results

Complete JGTC results
(key)

References

1953 births
Living people
Japanese racing drivers
Japanese Formula 3000 Championship drivers
24 Hours of Le Mans drivers
World Sportscar Championship drivers

Long Distance Series drivers
Japanese Sportscar Championship drivers